The William Marshall Anderson House is a historic house in Circleville, Ohio, United States.  Built in 1865 as the home of William Marshall Anderson, the house has been ranked as a leading example of Gothic Revival architecture.  Walls of brick and wood, covered with an asphalt roof, are decorated with many features of this style, including ornate wooden trim and ogive windows.  The house's well-preserved nineteenth-century architecture led to its placement on the National Register of Historic Places in 1979.

References

Houses completed in 1865
Circleville, Ohio
Gothic Revival architecture in Ohio
Houses in Pickaway County, Ohio
Houses on the National Register of Historic Places in Ohio
National Register of Historic Places in Pickaway County, Ohio